Xiao Xin, personal name Zi Song, was a Shang dynasty King of China.

Records 
In the Records of the Grand Historian he was listed by Sima Qian as the twentieth Shang king, succeeding his older brother Pan Geng. He was enthroned in the year of Jiawu with Yin as his capital. He ruled for 3 years, was given the posthumous name Xiao Xin and was succeeded by his younger brother Xiao Yi.
According to tradition, Xiao Xin was the 49th king of China.
Oracle script inscriptions on bones unearthed at Yinxu alternatively record that he was the nineteenth Shang king.

References

Shang dynasty kings
13th-century BC Chinese monarchs